Edward Arnet Johnson (born May 1, 1959) is an American former professional basketball player who spent 17 seasons in the National Basketball Association (NBA) and a year in the Greek Basket League midway through his career. With nearly 1,200 games in the NBA, he scored the second-most career points among players who never played in an NBA All-Star Game, behind Jamal Crawford. As of the 2018–19 season, he is ranked 52nd in all-time points scored, and ranked fifth-most in points scored by an eligible player not in the Naismith Memorial Basketball Hall of Fame.  he is the co-host of NBA Today, which airs weekdays on Sirius XM NBA Radio and also is the play-by-play TV analyst for the Phoenix Suns on Bally Sports Arizona.

Early life and college career
After graduating from Chicago's Westinghouse High School, Johnson, a sharpshooting 6'7" forward/guard, attended the University of Illinois, majoring in history, before being selected by the Kansas City Kings in the 1981 NBA draft. Among Fighting Illini fans he is probably best remembered for his game-winning shot against Michigan State University (MSU). At the time, MSU, which was led by future all-time NBA great Earvin "Magic" Johnson, was undefeated and ranked #1 in the nation, but Illinois was also undefeated at 14–0. The victory gave Illinois a 15–0 record and the #2 ranking nationally (Illinois subsequently faded during regular season play, but MSU went on to become eventual National Champions).

Johnson was elected to the "Illini Men's Basketball All-Century Team" in 2004.
Eddie Johnson was selected as a member of the 2019 class of the Illinois Athletics Hall of Fame.

Playing career

NBA
Johnson would play for the Kings, the Phoenix Suns, the Seattle SuperSonics, the Charlotte Hornets, the Indiana Pacers, the Houston Rockets, and Greek team Olympiacos (1994–1995) before retiring from basketball in 1999. Although his 19,202 points over 1,199 NBA games was the 22nd-highest total in NBA history at the time of his retirement, Johnson was never selected to play in the All-Star game nor ever chosen for an All-NBA team. In fact, the "awards highlight" of his career occurred in 1989, when he received the NBA Sixth Man of the Year Award as a member of the Suns. Johnson's career point total of 19,202 is also higher than all but 30 inductees into the Naismith Memorial Basketball Hall of Fame.

Europe
He also played for one year in the Greek Basket League, with the European powerhouse Olympiacos in the 1994–95 season. He became a cult favorite with the fans for his phenomenal shooting from outside the 3-point line. One game in particular established his enduring legend for the fans, when he scored four 3-pointers in the final minutes of the low-scoring and tense semi-final of the 1995 FIBA Champions' Cup (EuroLeague) against arch-rivals Panathinaikos. Olympiacos won that game 58–52, but lost the final to Real Madrid. In 18 games played in the EuroLeague, Johnson averaged 21.9 points, 4.6 rebounds, 1.8 assists, and 0.7 steals, in 35.1 minutes per game.

Johnson did, however, taste success in the Greek League, where he was instrumental in Olympiacos' 3–2 series win over Panathinaikos, in the Greek playoff finals of 1995. The fifth and vital game of that series ended in one of the lowest-scoring games ever, as Olympiacos scraped a 45–44 victory in a match that exhilarated fans. In 35 games played in the Greek Basket League with Olympiacos, Johnson totaled averages of 21.2 points, 5.0 rebounds, 2.1 assists, and 1.0 steals, in 34 minutes per game, in the 1994–95 season.

Return to NBA
After his season overseas, he then returned to the NBA and started the 1995–96 season with the Indiana Pacers. He was traded to the Denver Nuggets on February 20, 1997 where he was quickly released. However, he signed with the Houston Rockets for the remainder of the season to where he returned for the following two seasons. Along with his Sixth Man of the Year Award, he is also remembered for hitting the game-winning three-pointer as time expired in a 95–92 Rockets win over the Utah Jazz in game 4 of the 1997 Western Conference Finals. Johnson would play an additional season for the Rockets and then 3 games the following season before finally retiring as a player.

Post-NBA career
After his playing career was over, Johnson turned to broadcasting, serving as a color commentator for Arizona State, the WNBA's Phoenix Mercury, and currently the Phoenix Suns. Johnson is also an accomplished motivational speaker, and he has recently released an instructional DVD called Eddie Johnson's Jumpshot and Offensive Skills. Johnson is also a regular article contributor to the website Hoopshype.com and also enjoys debating his ideas, opinions, and thoughts with his readers.

Mistaken identity
In 2006, Eddie (Arnet) Johnson was mistaken in multiple media reports for former NBA player Edward (Lee) "Fast Eddie" Johnson (a guard, two-time NBA All-Star, one-time All-Defensive Second Team player, and four years older than Eddie A. Johnson) when the latter was arrested on suspicion of sexual assault of a minor and burglary on August 8 (Eddie L. Johnson would eventually be sentenced to life imprisonment for that crime and die in prison). While this was not the first time that Eddie L. Johnson had been arrested (by estimates, Johnson has been arrested 100 times), the heinousness of the crime, combined with the fact that it happened during the NBA offseason when Eddie A. Johnson would not normally be on TV, generated major controversy after other outlets failed to read the initial Associated Press story (which detailed correctly "Fast Eddie's" career and background) and put up the wrong Eddie Johnson's picture. Johnson called that day the "worst...of his life" and expressed concern that the case of mistaken identity might permanently sully his reputation. Johnson expressed to Jay Mariotti of the Chicago Sun-Times that he was considering legal action against the news outlets that used his picture or did not fact-check his identity against that of Edward Lee "Fast Eddie" Johnson.

Honors

College basketball
 1979 – Honorable Mention All-Big Ten
 1980 – Team MVP
 1980 – 2nd Team All-Big Ten
 1981 – Team Captain
 1981 – Team MVP
 1981 – 1st Team All-Big Ten
 2004 – Elected to the "Illini Men's Basketball All-Century Team"
 2008 – Honored as one of the thirty-three honored jerseys which hang in the State Farm Center to show regard for being the most decorated basketball players in University of Illinois history
 2019 – Inducted into the Illinois Athletics Hall of Fame

Career statistics

NBA

Regular season

|-
| style="text-align:left;"|
| style="text-align:left;"|Kansas City
| 74 || 27 || 20.5 || .459 || .091 || .664 || 4.4 || 1.5 || .7 || .2 || 9.3
|-
| style="text-align:left;"|
| style="text-align:left;"|Kansas City
| 82 || 82 || 35.8 || .494 || .282 || .779 || 6.1 || 2.6 || .9 || .2 || 19.8
|-
| style="text-align:left;"|
| style="text-align:left;"|Kansas City
| 82 || 82 || 35.6 || .485 || .313 || .810 || 5.5 || 3.6 || .9 || .3 || 21.9
|-
| style="text-align:left;"|
| style="text-align:left;"|Kansas City
| 82 || 81 || 36.9 || .491 || .241 || .871 || 5.0 || 3.3 || 1.0 || .3 || 22.9
|-
| style="text-align:left;"|
| style="text-align:left;"|Sacramento
| 82 || 30 || 30.7 || .475 || .200 || .816 || 5.1 || 2.6 || .7 || .2 || 18.7
|-
| style="text-align:left;"|
| style="text-align:left;"|Sacramento
| 81 || 30 || 30.3 || .463 || .314 || .829 || 4.4 || 3.1 || .5 || .2 || 18.7
|-
| style="text-align:left;"|
| style="text-align:left;"|Phoenix
| 73 || 59 || 29.8 || .480 || .255 || .850 || 4.4 || 2.5 || .5 || .1 || 17.7
|-
| style="text-align:left;"|
| style="text-align:left;"|Phoenix
| 70 || 7 || 29.2 || .497 || .413 || .868 || 4.4 || 2.3 || .7 || .1 || 21.5
|-
| style="text-align:left;"|
| style="text-align:left;"|Phoenix
| 64 || 4 || 28.3 || .453 || .380 || .917 || 3.8 || 1.7 || .5 || .2 || 16.9
|-
| style="text-align:left;"|
| style="text-align:left;"|Phoenix
| 15 || 0 || 20.8 || .473 || .286 || .724 || 3.1 || 1.1 || .6 || .1 || 13.5
|-
| style="text-align:left;"|
| style="text-align:left;"|Seattle
| 66 || 27 || 26.9 || .486 || .333 || .912 || 3.4 || 1.4 || .7 || .1 || 17.4
|-
| style="text-align:left;"|
| style="text-align:left;"|Seattle
| 81 || 19 || 29.2 || .459 || .252 || .861 || 3.6 || 2.0 || .7 || .1 || 17.1
|-
| style="text-align:left;"|
| style="text-align:left;"|Seattle
| 82 || 0 || 22.8 || .467 || .304 || .911 || 3.3 || 1.6 || .4 || .0 || 14.4
|-
| style="text-align:left;"|
| style="text-align:left;"|Charlotte
| 73 || 27 || 20.0 || .459 || .393 || .780 || 3.1 || 1.7 || .5 || .1 || 11.5
|-
| style="text-align:left;"|
| style="text-align:left;"|Indiana
| 62 || 1 || 16.2 || .413 || .352 || .886 || 2.5 || 1.1 || .3 || .1 || 7.7
|-
| style="text-align:left;"|
| style="text-align:left;"|Indiana
| 28 || 0 || 10.9 || .434 || .321 || .741 || 1.4 || .6 || .2 || .0 || 5.3
|-
| style="text-align:left;"|
| style="text-align:left;"|Houston
| 24 || 2 || 25.3 || .447 || .388 || .854 || 4.1 || 1.5 || .4 || .0 || 11.5
|-
| style="text-align:left;"|
| style="text-align:left;"|Houston
| 75 || 1 || 19.9 || .417 || .333 || .831 || 2.0 || 1.2 || .4 || .0 || 8.4
|-
| style="text-align:left;"|
| style="text-align:left;"|Houston
| 3 || 0 || 6.0 || .462 || .000 ||  || .7 || .3 || .0 || .0 || 4.0
|- class="sortbottom"
| style="text-align:center;" colspan="2"|Career
| 1,199 || 479 || 27.2 || .472 || .335 || .840 || 4.0 || 2.1 || .6 || .2 || 16.0

Playoffs

|-
| style="text-align:left;"|1984
| style="text-align:left;"|Kansas City
| 3 ||  || 35.7 || .438 || .400 || 1.000 || 3.3 || 4.0 || 1.0 || .3 || 17.0
|-
| style="text-align:left;"|1986
| style="text-align:left;"|Sacramento
| 3 || 1 || 32.0 || .436 || .000 || .889 || 7.0 || 1.3 || 1.0 || .3 || 18.7
|-
| style="text-align:left;"|1989
| style="text-align:left;"|Phoenix
| 12 || 0 || 32.7 || .413 || .342 || .769 || 7.3 || 2.1 || 1.0 || .2 || 17.8
|-
| style="text-align:left;"|1990
| style="text-align:left;"|Phoenix
| 16 || 0 || 21.1 || .450 || .395 || .787 || 3.6 || 1.1 || .6 || .3 || 12.3
|-
| style="text-align:left;"|1991
| style="text-align:left;"|Seattle
| 5 || 5 || 34.2 || .517 || .267 || .828 || 4.2 || 1.4 || 1.4 || .2 || 24.0
|-
| style="text-align:left;"|1992
| style="text-align:left;"|Seattle
| 9 || 0 || 27.4 || .474 || .182 || .941 || 3.0 || .9 || .3 || .3 || 18.4
|-
| style="text-align:left;"|1993
| style="text-align:left;"|Seattle
| 19 || 0 || 20.1 || .390 || .333 || .935 || 2.4 || .9 || .2 || .1 || 10.8
|-
| style="text-align:left;"|1996
| style="text-align:left;"|Indiana
| 1 || 0 || 9.0 || .000 || .000 || || .0 || 1.0 || .0 || .0 || .0
|-
| style="text-align:left;"|1997
| style="text-align:left;"|Houston
| 16 || 0 || 17.8 || .410 || .298 || .958 || 2.3 || .6 || .3 || .0 || 8.3
|-
| style="text-align:left;"|1998
| style="text-align:left;"|Houston
| 5 || 0 || 17.8 || .333 || .300 || .875 || 1.6 || .2 || .0 || .0 || 5.6
|- class="sortbottom"
| style="text-align:center;" colspan="2"|Career
| 89 || 6 || 23.8 || .429 || .310 || .864 || 3.5 || 1.1 || .5 || .1 || 13.1

FIBA European League

|-
| style="text-align:left;"|1994–95
| style="text-align:left;"|Olympiacos
| 18||  || 35.1 || .432 || .387 || .850 || 4.6 || 1.8 || .7 || .0 || 21.9 ||

College

|-
| style="text-align:left;"|1977–78
| style="text-align:left;"|Illinois
| 27 || 3 || 17.4 || .427 ||  || .741 || 3.1 || .6 || .4 || .3 || 8.1
|-
| style="text-align:left;"|1978–79
| style="text-align:left;"|Illinois
| 30 || 27 || 26.2 || .415 ||  || .531 || 5.7 || 1.7 || .6 || .1 || 12.1
|-
| style="text-align:left;"|1979–80
| style="text-align:left;"|Illinois
| 35 || 35 || 34.7 || .462 ||  || .655 || 8.9 || 2.0 || .4 || .2 || 17.4
|-
| style="text-align:left;"|1980–81
| style="text-align:left;"|Illinois
| 29 || 29 || 34.8 || .494 ||  || .756 || 9.2 || 2.4 || 1.0 || .2 || 17.2
|- class="sortbottom"
| style="text-align:center;" colspan="2"|Career
| 121 || 94 || 28.8 || .454 ||  || .671 || 6.9 || 1.7 || .6 || .2 || 14.0

See also
 List of National Basketball Association career games played leaders

References

External links

 Positive Side of Sports

1959 births
Living people
African-American basketball players
African-American sports announcers
African-American sports journalists
American expatriate basketball people in Greece
American men's basketball players
Basketball players from Chicago
Charlotte Hornets players
George Westinghouse College Prep alumni
Greek Basket League players
Houston Rockets players
Illinois Fighting Illini men's basketball players
Indiana Pacers players
Kansas City Kings draft picks
Kansas City Kings players
Olympiacos B.C. players
Parade High School All-Americans (boys' basketball)
Phoenix Suns announcers
Phoenix Suns players
Sacramento Kings players
Seattle SuperSonics players
Small forwards
21st-century African-American people
20th-century African-American sportspeople